Thomas High School may refer to:

 Fort Thomas High School, Fort Thomas, Arizona
 Norman Thomas High School, New York City
 Thomas High School (West Virginia), a former school in Tucker County Schools, West Virginia
 Thomas High School (Oklahoma), Thomas, Oklahoma
 Webster Thomas High School, Webster, New York

See also
 St. Thomas High School (disambiguation)